The St George the Conqueror Chapel Mausoleum (Paraklis-mavzoley „Sv. Georgi Pobedonosets“) is a mausoleum (ossuary) and memorial Bulgarian Orthodox chapel, as well as a major landmark of Pleven, Bulgaria.

Built between 1903 and 1907 in the Neo-Byzantine style by the architect P. Koychev, whose project won a contest in 1903, it is dedicated to the Russian and Romanian soldiers who fell for the Liberation of Bulgaria during the Siege of Plevna of 1877. The remains of many of these soldiers are preserved in the mausoleum. The icons in the chapel mausoleum are the work of Bulgarian artists.

The chapel mausoleum bears the name of Saint George, the patron saint of soldiers, and is also depicted in the coat of arms of Pleven. It lies on the main Vazrazhdane Square.

References
 

Chapels in Bulgaria
Churches completed in 1907
20th-century Eastern Orthodox church buildings
Byzantine Revival architecture in Bulgaria
Buildings and structures in Pleven
Mausoleums in Bulgaria
Tourist attractions in Pleven Province
20th-century churches in Bulgaria